Heavy Traffic is the soundtrack to Ralph Bakshi's 1973 film Heavy Traffic. The film's score was performed by Ed Bogas and Ray Shanklin. The soundtrack album was released on Fantasy Records in 1973. The album was released on compact disc in 1996 as part of a compilation that featured both the soundtracks to Fritz the Cat and Heavy Traffic on the same disc.

Track listing 
 Scarborough Fair (P.D., arr. Simon & Garfunkel)
Performed by Sérgio Mendes and Brasil '66
 Scarborough Street Fair (P.D., arr. Bogas)
 Twist and Shout (Russell-Medley)
Performed by The Isley Brothers
 Angie's Theme (Bogas)
 Take Five (Desmond)
Performed by the Dave Brubeck quartet
 Carole's Theme (Shanklin)
 Heavy Traffic (Shanklin)
 What You Sow (Bogas)
 Maybellene (Berry)
Performed by Chuck Berry
 Michael's Scarborough Fair (P.D., arr. Bogas)
 Ballroom Beauties (Bogas)
 Ballroom Dancers (Shanklin)
 Cartoon Time (Bogas)
 Ten-Cent Philosophy (Bogas-Shanklin)

References

1973 soundtrack albums
Ed Bogas albums
Fantasy Records soundtracks
Fritz the Cat
Ray Shanklin albums
Soul jazz albums
Drama film soundtracks